1.3.8. is a compilation album by death metal band Devourment, released in 2000 by Corpse Gristle. The album was reissued in 2004 by Displeased Records and Unmatched Brutality Records with an upgraded layout and new artwork. 1.3.8 was also released as a limited edition record by the label Night of the Vinyl Dead. It includes one new song called "Babykiller", the three tracks from the Impaled demo, and all eight tracks from Molesting the Decapitated.

Track listing
 "Babykiller" – 4:29
 "Shroud of Encryption" (demo) – 2:58
 "Festering Vomitous Mass" (demo) – 2:35
 "Choking on Bile" (demo) – 4:16
 "Festering Vomitous Mass" – 2:51
 "Postmortal Coprophagia" – 6:15
 "Choking on Bile" – 4:17
 "Molesting the Decapitated" – 4:42
 "Self Disembowelment" – 4:34
 "Fucked to Death" – 5:28
 "Devour the Damned" – 4:22
 "Shroud of Encryption" – 2:57

Personnel
 Wayne Knupp – vocals (1–4)
 Ruben Rosas – vocals (5–12)
 Brian "Brain" Wynn – guitars
 Kevin Clark – guitars
 Mike Majewski – bass
 Brad Fincher – drums
 D. Braxton Henry – guitar (1), backing vocals (4)

References

Devourment compilation albums
2000 compilation albums